The Occupation is a single-player adventure video game developed by White Paper Games and released on PlayStation 4, Xbox One, and Microsoft Windows on 5 March 2019. The game takes place in a single government building, in real-time over four hours. The game advances with or without input from the player, but almost all in-game actions can affect the game's story.

The game is set in late 1987 within the same universe as White Paper Games' first title Ether One.

Gameplay
The game does not have a health bar or energy system, when the game needs to punish the player it does so by using up the player's time, for example if a player is caught doing something they should not, they are taken to a security office and lose 15 minutes of game time, which shortens the time available to achieve the main aim of the game, obtaining knowledge.

Plot
Prior to the start of the game; a terrorist attack has killed 23 people and led the British Government to create The Union Act, a "controversial act which threatens the civil liberties of the British population."

The game's plot starts at 3:27 PM on 24 October 1987. The player character is a journalist that is researching The Union Act, players have freedom of choice on how to act; become a whistle blowing journalist fighting against the act, or do nothing as the game progresses on its own.

Development
The game was developed on Unreal 4 and uses dynamic artificial intelligence, which combines scripted activities for the in-game characters, along with deviations to their normal routine based on their in-game requirements or interactions. The developers illustrated this by explaining the actions of a character called Dan, a Scottish Muslim who is a "towering bald man who screams security", he breaks his usual desk based routine, because of his need to pray at certain times, creating a circumstance that the player can take advantage of should they wish.

Reception

Awards
The game was nominated for "Best Use of Game Engine" at the Develop:Star Awards.

References

External links  
 The Occupation - game site  

2019 video games
PlayStation 4 games
Windows games
Indie video games
Video games developed in the United Kingdom
Video games set in the United Kingdom
Video games set in 1987
Stealth video games
Unreal Engine games
Single-player video games
Xbox One games
Humble Games games
White Paper Games games